Permanent Record is a 1988 American drama film starring Pamela Gidley, Michelle Meyrink, Keanu Reeves, Jennifer Rubin, and Alan Boyce. It was filmed on location in Portland, Oregon and Yaquina Head near Newport on the Oregon Coast. The film primarily deals with the profound effect of suicide, and how friends and family work their way through the grief.

Plot 
David Sinclair (Alan Boyce) seems to have everything. He is smart, talented, funny, and popular. He is best friends with Chris Townsend (Keanu Reeves), a quirky outsider. He seems to have it all together, yet as his personal academic expectations and those of his parents become overwhelming, he seemingly is keeping emotional problems a secret to himself.

At a party with his school friends along the coast, he takes a walk to the edge of a cliff overlooking the ocean.

Chris, playful as ever, decides to sneak up on his friend, but when he emerges from behind a rock, David is not there. He has fallen to his death. Originally assumed to be a horrible accident, the situation changes when Chris receives a suicide note in the mail. Chris and David's girlfriend, Lauren (Jennifer Rubin), want to hold some type of memorial, but a reluctant school decides against it, leaving the kids to memorialize their friend in their own way.

Cast 
 Keanu Reeves as Chris Townsend
 Alan Boyce as David Sinclair
 Michelle Meyrink as M.G.
 Jennifer Rubin as Lauren
 Barry Corbin as Jim Sinclair
 Kathy Baker as Martha Sinclair
 Pamela Gidley as Kim
 Richard Bradford as Leo Verdell
 Michael Elgart as Dakin
 Dakin Matthews as Mr. McBain
 Lou Reed as himself

Reception 
Permanent Record received mixed reviews from critics upon its release. The film holds a 47% rating on Rotten Tomatoes based on 15 reviews.

Roger Ebert of the Chicago Sun-Times praised the film as one of the best 1988 had to offer, stating all the performances were appropriate to the material, whilst also praising Silver for finding authentic ways to portray emotions.

Variety Reviews applauded Reeves' performance in the latter half of the film, citing Boyce's character's suicide as the primary reason, although also criticizing the female characters in the film.

Rob Gonsalves of efilmcritic.com criticized the film, stating it was nothing more than a 'TV-Movie drama film,' whilst also criticizing the climax of the story. However, he also praised the performance of Keanu Reeves.

Soundtrack 
The musical score for Permanent Record was composed by Joe Strummer, former member of the punk rock band The Clash. A soundtrack album was released in 1988 and featured five songs by Joe Strummer and the Latino Rockabilly War with Keanu Reeves guest starring on rhythm guitar for the album's opening track, as well as individual tracks by Lou Reed, The Stranglers, BoDeans, The Godfathers, and J. D. Souther.

References

External links 
 
 

1988 films
1988 drama films
American drama films
American high school films
Films about grieving
Films about suicide
Films directed by Marisa Silver
Films set in Oregon
Films shot in Oregon
Films shot in Portland, Oregon
Paramount Pictures films
1980s English-language films
1980s American films